Mario Renosto (15 June 1929 in Venice – 14 November 1988) was an Italian professional footballer who played as a midfielder.

He played for 9 seasons (121 games, 30 goals) in the Serie A for S.S.C. Venezia, A.C. Milan, A.S. Roma, Novara Calcio and U.S. Triestina Calcio.

His older brother Giacinto Renosto also played football professionally. To distinguish them, Giacinto was referred to as Renosto I and Mario as Renosto II.

Honours
Milan
 Serie A champion: 1950–51.

References

1929 births
1988 deaths
Italian footballers
Serie A players
Venezia F.C. players
A.C. Milan players
A.S. Roma players
Novara F.C. players
U.S. Triestina Calcio 1918 players
A.C.R. Messina players
Association football midfielders